The Arthur Fiedler Footbridge is a wheelchair accessible footbridge named after Arthur Fiedler in Boston, Massachusetts, United States.

The bridge was built in 1953, in brutalist style, and dedicated in 1954 to honor 25 years of concerts by the Boston Pops Orchestra at the Esplanade.  It was renovated in 2021.

References

External links
 
 Arthur Fiedler Footbridge – Boston, MA at Waymarking

Bridges in Boston
Charles River Esplanade
Footbridges